Nundah Cemetery is a heritage-listed cemetery at 88 Hedley Avenue, Nundah, City of Brisbane, Queensland, Australia. It was built from 1840s to 1963. It is also known as German Station Cemetery. It was added to the Queensland Heritage Register on 21 October 1992.

History
The cemetery was established in 1846 by a small group of German Lutheran missionaries who, in 1838, had founded Queensland's first free settlement, at Zion's Hill above Kedron Brook. At that time, the district was known as "German Station", as the earliest settlers were Lutheran missionaries, and hence the cemetery was originally known as "German Station Cemetery". The district was originally outside of the town of Brisbane and was a farming community. At that time, the road beside the cemetery was known as "Cemetery Road". Only one death had been recorded at the German Station by 1845, but several children died the following year, and the cemetery is indicated on an 1846 sketch by missionary Carl Gerler.

As the German station settlement was established in 1838, it is unclear where the earliest burials in the settlement would have occurred. Certainly the site had been established as a graveyard before James Warner first surveyed it as a cemetery reserve in 1862. None of the wooden crosses marking the earliest graves has survived, but the oldest headstone dates to March 1855.

Many of the pioneers of the Nundah district are buried in this cemetery. Although the German Station mission was wound down between 1844 and 1850, several of the missionary families remained in the area. From amongst these settlers the first trustees of the German Station Cemetery were appointed in 1866. 

One of the duties of cemetery trustees was to maintain a record of the burials. However, the first recorded burial was in 1887 and it is believed the earlier records may have been lost in a flood. However, even after 1887, the records the trustees kept of burials were somewhat "sketchy" at times. The public can update the Nundah burial records by providing death certificates showing a burial at the Nundah Cemetery.

The development of the Sandgate railway line (now the Shorncliffe railway line) through the district in 1882 opened it up for residential area housing for the growing town of Brisbane. As "Cemetery Road" was regarded as an unattractive name for a residential street, it was renamed "Hedley Avenue" about 1934 after local doctor Hedley Brown.

In 1914 a small shelter pavilion was erected at the cemetery. It was designed by architect John Henry Burley, who practised in Brisbane from 1886 until 1936. The builder was J MacDonald, and the structure cost .

In the 1930s, Brisbane City Council took over the management of the cemetery from the local trustees (by this time Nundah was within the boundaries of the City of Brisbane). In 1963 the cemetery was closed as no new grave sites were available.

A sexton resided in the cemetery grounds from at least the 1890s, but since 1975 one sexton based at Lutwyche has cared for the Bald Hills, Lutwyche and Nundah cemeteries. The Nundah sexton's house has been demolished.

In 1982 the Nundah Historic Cemetery Preservation Association was formed to help tend and restore the site.

War Graves
There are 7 service personnel buried in this cemetery whose graves are registered by the Commonwealth War Graves Commission, 6 from World War I and one from World War II.

Current use
Although the cemetery has no space for new gravesites, it is possible to place cremated ashes in existing family graves or in the columbarium walls. It is also possible for family members to be buried in existing graves which are not yet full. In 2011, the Brisbane City Council raised concerns about its ability to continue to provide new gravesites after another 10 or 15 years given that burial rights are perpetual in Queensland (in some other states of Australia, there is a fixed tenure). As a consequence, Brisbane City Council will now allow reuse of even full family graves in Nundah Cemetery where the last burial was over 30 years ago.

Description 

The cemetery reserve is located on a small, elliptical ridge above Kedron Brook at Nundah, adjacent to Albert Bishop Park. The entrance has a westerly aspect to Hedley Avenue.

Native trees have been planted recently around the perimeter, but the cemetery itself is exposed and the land subject to erosion. Many of the pathways have been concreted to prevent further deterioration.

The cemetery is crowded, with little order to the layout of graves, and no denominational segregation.

It contains a variety of headstone and decorative memorial monument types, from high Victorian to modern stela. An ongoing restoration programme has resulted in many of these being refurbished or replaced, and a number of plaques have been erected on graves of particular historical note.

Toward the front of the reserve, and amidst the gravesites, is an hexagonal rotunda. Constructed of timber posts with arched batten infilling to each facet, the structure is capped by a steeply pitched asbestos tile roof, with terracotta ridging and centre finial. The rotunda was renovated in the 1980s.

The cemetery furnishes a unique record of the families who developed Nundah and surrounding districts from 1838. Included amongst the graves are those of many of the early German missionaries and their families, and that of Sir James Dickson (Queensland Premier from 1898 1899).

Heritage listing 
Nundah Cemetery was listed on the Queensland Heritage Register on 21 October 1992 having satisfied the following criteria.

The place is important in demonstrating the evolution or pattern of Queensland's history.

Queensland's oldest surviving cemetery and the first to be associated with free settlement in the colony.

The place demonstrates rare, uncommon or endangered aspects of Queensland's cultural heritage.

A unique source of historical information.

The place is important because of its aesthetic significance.

Its aesthetic quality and contribution to the Nundah townscape

The place has a strong or special association with a particular community or cultural group for social, cultural or spiritual reasons.

An expression of aspects of the social, religious, economic and artistic life of the local community, and of its attitudes, values and tastes.

Notable people buried in Nundah Cemetery
 William Maxwell 1867–1921, former member for Queensland Parliament.  . Was elected to the Queensland Legislative Assembly as the member for Burke in 1899.  Maxwell founding member when the Federation of Australia was formed in 1901, making a monumental moment in Australia's history.  Maxwell has a large family plot in Nundah having had 6 children himself.

 George Bridges and wife Mary (née Brightman), pioneers who developed the Nundah township
 Thomas Bridges, Member of the Legislative Assembly for the electorate of Nundah
 James Dickson, Premier of Queensland and Commonwealth Minister for Defence
 John McMaster, the "Father of Brisbane", 4 times mayor of Brisbane, Member of both the Queensland Legislative Assembly and Queensland Legislative Council

See also :Category:Burials at Nundah Cemetery

See also

 List of cemeteries in Australia

References

Attribution

External links 
 
 

Cemeteries in Brisbane
Queensland Heritage Register
Nundah, Queensland
Articles incorporating text from the Queensland Heritage Register
1846 establishments in Australia
Cemeteries established in the 1840s